13th Online Film Critics Society Awards
January 5, 2010

Best Picture: 
 The Hurt Locker 
The 13th Online Film Critics Society Awards, honoring the best in film for 2009, were announced on 5 January 2010.

Winners and nominees

Best Picture
The Hurt Locker
Inglourious Basterds
A Serious Man
Up
Up in the Air

Best Director
Kathryn Bigelow – The Hurt Locker
Neill Blomkamp – District 9
James Cameron – Avatar
Joel Coen and Ethan Coen – A Serious Man
Quentin Tarantino – Inglourious Basterds

Best Actor
Jeremy Renner – The Hurt Locker
Jeff Bridges – Crazy Heart
George Clooney – Up in the Air
Sharlto Copley – District 9
Joaquin Phoenix – Two Lovers

Best Actress
Mélanie Laurent – Inglourious Basterds
Carey Mulligan – An Education
Gabourey Sidibe – Precious
Meryl Streep – Julie & Julia
Tilda Swinton – Julia

Best Supporting Actor
Christoph Waltz – Inglourious Basterds
Peter Capaldi – In the Loop
Jackie Earle Haley – Watchmen
Woody Harrelson – The Messenger
Anthony Mackie – The Hurt Locker

Best Supporting Actress
Mo'Nique – Precious
Vera Farmiga – Up in the Air
Anna Kendrick – Up in the Air
Diane Kruger – Inglourious Basterds
Julianne Moore – A Single Man

Best Original Screenplay
Inglourious Basterds – Quentin Tarantino
(500) Days of Summer – Scott Neustadter & Michael H. Weber
The Hurt Locker – Mark Boal
A Serious Man – Joel Coen and Ethan Coen
Up – Bob Peterson

Best Adapted Screenplay
Fantastic Mr. Fox – Wes Anderson and Noah Baumbach
District 9 – Neill Blomkamp & Terri Tatchell
In the Loop – Jesse Armstrong, Simon Blackwell, Armando Iannucci and Tony Roche
Up in the Air – Jason Reitman and Sheldon Turner
Where the Wild Things Are – Spike Jonze & Dave Eggers

Best Foreign Language Film
The White Ribbon
Broken Embraces
Police, Adjective
Silent Light
Summer Hours

Best Documentary
Anvil! The Story of Anvil
The Beaches of Agnès
Capitalism: A Love Story
The Cove
Food, Inc.

Best Animated Feature
Up
Coraline
Fantastic Mr. Fox
Ponyo
The Princess and the Frog

Best Cinematography
Inglourious Basterds – Robert Richardson
Avatar – Mauro Fiore
District 9 – Trent Opaloch
The Hurt Locker – Barry Ackroyd
A Serious Man – Roger Deakins

Best Editing
The Hurt Locker – Chris Innis and Bob Murawski
(500) Days of Summer – Alan Edward Bell
Avatar – Steve R. Moore, John Refoua & Stephen Rivkin
District 9 – Julian Clarke
Inglourious Basterds – Sally Menke

Best Original Score
Up – Michael Giacchino
Fantastic Mr. Fox – Alexandre Desplat
The Informant! – Marvin Hamlisch
Star Trek – Michael Giacchino
Where the Wild Things Are – Carter Burwell and Karen O

References 

2009 film awards
2009